Lepidostomatidae is a family in the order Trichoptera. It is widely dispersed around the world. Larvae shapes vary. Larvae are normally found near bodies of water. It was first discovered by Georg Ulmer in 1903.

Distribution
It is normally found in the Northern Hemisphere. Some species' range extends south to Panama and New Guinea.

Larvae
Larvae cases are mostly square shaped or circular. Larvae cases are normally found near rivers or stream beds, although some are found near lake beds.

References

Bibliography

 Ulmer, G. (1903) Ueber die Metamorphose der Trichopteren. Hamburg, Germany: Abhandlungen des Naturwissenschaftlichen vereins. 
 Weaver, J.S., III. (1988) A synopsis of the North American Lepidostomatidae (Trichoptera). American Entomological Institute. 

Trichoptera families
Integripalpia